The Second cabinet of Adolphe Thiers was announced on 1 March 1840 by King Louis Philippe I.
It replaced the Second cabinet of Nicolas Jean-de-Dieu Soult.  

The ministry was replaced on 29 October 1840 by the Third cabinet of Nicolas Jean-de-Dieu Soult.

Ministers

The cabinet was created by ordinance of 1 March 1840. The ministers were:

 President of the Council of Ministers: Adolphe Thiers
 Foreign Affairs: Adolphe Thiers
 Interior: 
 Charles de Rémusat (Minister)
 Léon de Maleville (Sub-secretary of State, from 2 March 1840)
 Justice and Religious Affairs: Alexandre-François Vivien
 War: Amédée Despans-Cubières
 Finance: Joseph Pelet de la Lozère
 Navy and Colonies: Albin Roussin
 Public Education: Victor Cousin
 Public Works: Hippolyte François Jaubert
 Agriculture and Commerce: 
 Alexandre Goüin (Minister)
 Adolphe Billault (Sub-secretary of State, from 3 March 1840)

References

Sources

French governments
1840 establishments in France
1840 disestablishments in France
Cabinets established in 1840
Cabinets disestablished in 1840